Mojin-dong is a dong, neighbourhood of Gwangjin-gu in Seoul, South Korea.

See also 
Administrative divisions of South Korea

References

External links
 Gwangjin-gu official website in English
 Map of Gwangjin-gu at the Gwangjin-gu official website

Neighbourhoods of Gwangjin District